The Seychelles national basketball team represents Seychelles in international competitions. It is administrated by the Seychelles Basketball Federation.

The Seychelles have competed well at the Indian Ocean Island Games but have yet to qualify for the African Basketball Championship.

Roster
Team for the AfroBasket 2015 qualification.

Competitions

Performance at Summer Olympics
yet to qualify

Performance at World championships
yet to qualify

Performance at FIBA Africa Championship
yet to qualify

Performance at African Games
 1987–2011: Did Not Qualify
 2015: 9th
 2019: 5-on-5 basketball did not take place in the 2019 African Games.  A 3-on-3 tournament was organized, but a Seychellois team did not participate.

References

External links
Seychelles Basketball Records at FIBA Archive
Africabasket – Seychelles Men National Team

Men's national basketball teams
Basketball
Basketball in Seychelles
1979 establishments in Seychelles